Ernest Edward "Ernie" Bond (29 June 1897 – 25 July 1984) was an Australian politician.

He was born in Heywood to rural worker Robert Bond and Sarah Jane Mullens. He attended Geelong High School and became a schoolteacher at Lavers Hill and Heywood, and then head teacher at Greenwald and Condah. On 20 July 1923 he married Ethel Thomas, with whom he had three children. A member of the Labor Party's Heywood branch from the age of seventeen, he won a by-election for the Victorian Legislative Assembly seat of Glenelg in 1924; he transferred to Port Fairy and Glenelg in 1927. In 1932 he was expelled from the Labor Party over his support for the Premiers' Plan; he was re-elected as an independent and was readmitted to the Labor Party in 1937. He served until his retirement in 1943. Subsequently, he was a dairy farmer until 1964, when he retired to Portland. Bond died in Heywood in 1984.

References

1897 births
1984 deaths
Australian Labor Party members of the Parliament of Victoria
Independent members of the Parliament of Victoria
Members of the Victorian Legislative Assembly
20th-century Australian politicians